Wendy Holdener (born 12 May 1993) is a Swiss World Cup alpine ski racer who specialises in slalom and combined. She is a two-time World champion in combined and a five-time Olympic medalist, four individual with one gold medal in the team event at Pyeongchang in 2018. Four years later in 2022, she won a silver medal in the combined.

Career

Holdener made her World Cup debut in Sölden in October 2010, and attained her first podium in March 2013, a second place in slalom at Ofterschwang. In 2016, she gained her first two World Cup victories and won the crystal globe title in the combined discipline.

Holdener's first win in a World Cup slalom came in November 2022 at Killington, shared with Anna Swenn-Larsson, after thirty previous podiums in the discipline without a victory. Another win came two weeks later at Sestriere, Italy.

World Cup results

Season titles
 2 titles – (2 combined)

Season standings

Race podiums
 5 wins – (2 SL, 1 PSL, 2 AC)
 47 podiums – (33 SL, 5 PSL, 5 AC, 2 GS, 2 SG)

World Championship results

Olympic results

References

External links

Swiss Ski team at Swiss Ski Team 
Head Skis at Head website
 

Swiss female alpine skiers
1993 births
Living people
Alpine skiers at the 2014 Winter Olympics
Alpine skiers at the 2018 Winter Olympics
Alpine skiers at the 2022 Winter Olympics
Olympic alpine skiers of Switzerland
Medalists at the 2018 Winter Olympics
Medalists at the 2022 Winter Olympics
Olympic medalists in alpine skiing
Olympic gold medalists for Switzerland
Olympic silver medalists for Switzerland
Olympic bronze medalists for Switzerland
Sportspeople from the canton of Schwyz
21st-century Swiss women